The Martin family of Portland, Oregon, United States, disappeared on December 7, 1958, in the Columbia River Gorge during a day trip to gather greenery for Christmas decorations. The missing included the husband, Kenneth Martin (aged 54); his wife, Barbara Martin (48); and the couple's three daughters, Barbara ("Barbie"), Virginia, and Susan (aged 14, 13, and 11, respectively). The family's eldest child, Donald, was in the United States Navy and stationed in New York at the time of the disappearance.

Police initially speculated that the family's car may have crashed into the river, though the circumstances surrounding the event could not be fully explained. Further complicating the case was the discovery of a stolen handgun and the arrest of two ex-convicts in the area the day after the family's disappearance; investigators were unable to determine if the incidents were in any way connected.

The whereabouts of Kenneth, Barbara, and Barbie remain undetermined, and their vehicle has never been recovered. The family's disappearance has been described as one of the "most baffling" mysteries in Oregon history, and it sparked the greatest manhunt the state had undertaken at the time.

Disappearance
On the evening of December 7, 1958, Kenneth and Barbara Martin of Portland, Oregon, attended a Christmas party before returning to their home at 1715 N.E. 56th Avenue in the Roseway neighborhood of Northeast Portland. The couple had made plans for a day trip into the country for the following day.

In the late morning of December 7, Kenneth and Barbara left their home with their daughters Barbie, Susan, and Virginia, in their 1954 cream and red-colored Ford Country Squire station wagon. Barbie, the eldest daughter, was a freshman at Grant High School. The family's eldest child, a son named Donald aged 28 at the time, was in the United States Navy and stationed in New York at the time.

The family headed east for a drive into the Columbia River Gorge, where they intended to gather greenery to make Christmas wreaths and decorations. The knowledge of where the Martins were specifically throughout the day is sparse. According to Baxter, he recalled their car continuing east after they had purchased gasoline. Other reports from passing motorists indicated that the family was seen in an unspecified location on the north bank of the Columbia River, in Washington state, at dusk.

According to eyewitnesses who saw the family that day, Kenneth was reportedly wearing a tan zip-up jacket and dark slacks, while Barbara wore a navy blue coat, a plaid jacket, and a black print dress. Barbie was reportedly dressed in jeans with rolled cuffs and a beige coat.

Investigation

Initial search efforts

On December 9, Kenneth failed to report to his job at Eccles Electric Home Service Company, while Barbie was noted absent from her morning classes at Grant High School. Both Susan and Virginia were also reported absent by their teachers at Rose City School. The family was officially reported missing that evening by Kenneth's boss, Taylor Eccles. Police investigated their residence at approximately 11:00 p.m., searching for any signs of foul play. The house had been left undisturbed; a load of laundry was still in the washing machine, and dishes from the previous day were left on a drying rack in the kitchen; there was also a substantial amount of money in the Martins' bank accounts.

Searches were undertaken by both Multnomah County and Hood River County police, but neither were able to produce substantial leads. A stolen white Chevrolet registered in Venice, Los Angeles, California was found in Cascade Locks the day of the Martins' disappearance, but was quickly dismissed by police as it did not match the Martins' vehicle. Also found near the site of the abandoned Chevrolet was a .38 Colt Commander handgun, which had been disposed of in the bushes, and was covered in dried blood. The handgun was turned over to law enforcement but never processed for evidence. The gun's serial number was traced to a Meier and Frank department store, and it was subsequently discovered that the gun had been among several sporting good items that the son Donald Martin had been accused of stealing while working at a Meier and Frank two years prior.

Alleged sightings
On December 8, Roy Light and another unnamed man both ex-convicts were arrested for car theft in Hood River County in connection with the abandoned Chevrolet, which raised suspicion in relation to the Martins' disappearance. A waiter at the Hood River restaurant where the Martins were last seen told law enforcement he saw Light (who was an acquaintance) and the other ex-convict in the restaurant at the same time; he also stated that the two men left at the same time the Martins did. 

Various other tips were submitted to law enforcement in the weeks and months following the family's disappearance, including over 200 letters and hundreds of phone calls. Among them were a report from an orchard owner east of Portland who claimed to have witnessed a man and woman on December 7, gathering greenery in a canyon where a Native American burial ground was located. He added that the following week, he noticed a flock of buzzards flying in this direction. The canyon was searched, but nothing was found. On December 28, 1958, a woman's glove was discovered near the site of the abandoned Chevrolet, which family stated was "similar" to a glove Barbara "would wear"; however, it could not positively be identified as belonging to her. Days later, on December 31, a man called police reporting he had seen a vehicle matching the Martins' speeding on the Baldock Freeway. Police were alerted along the freeway, but the car could not be located. A letter was also received from a witness who claimed to have seen a family resembling the Martins in Burlington, Iowa on Christmas Eve. One of the last reported sightings of the Martins' vehicle came on January 7, 1959, from a truck driver who stated he had seen a car matching the Martins' description parked in Billings, Montana, with Oregon license plates.

By February 1959, investigators had undertaken searches of various locations, including the greater Portland metropolitan region, as well as searches on Mount Hood. During this time, a volunteer searcher found tire tracks leading off of a cliff near The Dalles, which reportedly matched the tires on the Martins' Ford. Paint chips recovered at this location were sent to the Federal Bureau of Investigation (FBI) for analysis, and it was determined that the paint was the same paint used on the make and model of the Martins' vehicle.

Recovery of Susan and Virginia

On May 1, 1959, three months after the tire tracks were reported, a river drilling rig near The Dalles reportedly hooked something of substantial weight to its anchor; however, it became dislodged before it could be pulled to the surface. In the early morning hours of May 2, a fisherman and his wife reported seeing what appeared to be two bodies floating downstream near Cascade Locks; they later encountered them near Bonneville Dam. Her identity was positively confirmed via dental records.

Susan's body was taken to the Clark County medical examiner's office before being transferred to Multnomah County in Portland for autopsies on both bodies to be performed. One of the technicians who had taken fingerprints prior to the autopsies indicated to the medical examiner what they believed to be bullet holes in the heads of each of the girls' bodies; however, according to the medical examiner's report, no such injuries were found, and the cause of death for both of the girls was officially declared as drowning. Traces of metal, including aluminum, were recovered from Susan's clothing. Interestingly, the spot on the river bank where the drill rig encountered a submerged object, and where the car is suspected to have gone into the river, is directly opposite an aluminum smelting plant.

Rupert Gillmouthe, the sheriff of Hood River County at the time, suspected that the drilling rig had overturned the Martins' car at the bottom of the river, and dislodged one of the doors, allowing the bodies of Susan and Virginia to escape and surface downstream. Further searches of the water were undertaken by both sonar and helicopter, but were unfruitful. The search for Kenneth, Barbara, and Barbie was subsequently suspended after a search diver nearly drowned.

Aftermath and theories
Police theorized that the family may have died as a result of Kenneth crashing their vehicle into the river, while another theory held that the family had been abducted and forced off of a cliffside into the river. In 1961, three years after the family's disappearance, a resident of Camas wrote a letter to The Oregon Journal stating that they were parked with a companion in Cascade Locks on December 7, 1958, and had witnessed a vehicle proceeding under the railroad tracks leading toward the locks. Moments later, they heard screaming, but upon investigating, found nothing.

In December 1966, eight years after the family's disappearance, eldest son Donald—the only surviving member of the family—inherited the family's "modest" estate, which had been in mandated probate for seven years. He later immigrated to Kapolei, Hawaii and became a teacher at James Campbell High School, ʻEwa Beach. Donald passed away on October 8, 2004 at the age of 73, leaving three children behind. He is buried together with his wife at the National Memorial Cemetery of the Pacific.

Multnomah County police consistently suspected foul play in the Martins' disappearance, based on the evidence of the tire tracks that indicated the family's vehicle was deliberately pushed from the cliff. Also troubling were the reported sightings of the family at dusk on the north bank of the river in Washington state, while the tire tracks placed them on the south side of the river in Oregon; this would suggest that their car would have fallen over the cliff after nightfall. The arrest of the two ex-convicts in the Hood River area the day after the family's disappearance, for car theft, was also noted, though police were unable to determine if the incidents were related. Walter Graven, a Portland detective who died in 1988, ardently felt the family had met with foul play, and that their murders would be solved once their car was discovered.

The cremains of Susan and Virginia remained at the River View Abbey Mausoleum in Portland, unclaimed for over a decade after their deaths. On December 30, 1969, the urns containing their cremains were retrieved by an unknown individual. The girls' paternal grandmother, Margaret Martin, had died the day before, December 29, and the girls' cremains were claimed while funeral arrangements were being made for her.

For most of the latter part of the 20th century, search efforts to recover the remaining three missing family members were not made. In July 1999, however, Oregonian journalist Margie Boulé, who had become interested in the case, organized a dive search of the Columbia River near Cascade Locks, searching for the Martins' car. This search utilized new sonar, Global Positioning System (GPS), and lidar underwater acoustic technology, but ultimately proved unsuccessful.

, the remains of Kenneth, Barbara, and Barbie remain undiscovered, and their vehicle has not been found.

See also
List of people who disappeared mysteriously: 1910-1990

Notes

References

Sources

External links
Documentary short on the case by KOIN News
Kenneth R. Martin at The Charley Project
Barbara Martin at The Charley Project
Barbara 'Barbie' Martin at The Charley Project

1950s missing person cases
1958 in Oregon
1959 in Oregon
1958 crimes in the United States
1958 deaths
Deaths by drowning
Mass disappearances
December 1958 events in the United States
History of Oregon
Missing American children
Missing person cases in Oregon
People from Portland, Oregon
Unsolved deaths in the United States